Mount Ida School District 20 is a public school district based in Mount Ida, Arkansas. The school district serves more than 500 students and employs more than 80 educators and staff at its two schools and district offices.

The school district encompasses  of land in Montgomery County and Garland County and serves all or portions of Mount Ida, Story, Sims, Norman, Oden, Bonnerdale, Royal and Jessieville.

Schools 
 Mount Ida Elementary School, serving grades prekindergarten through grade 6.
 Mount Ida High School, serving grades 7 through 12.

References

External links 

Education in Garland County, Arkansas
Education in Montgomery County, Arkansas
School districts in Arkansas